Crane Glacier, is a narrow glacier which flows  in an east-northeasterly direction along the northwest side of Aristotle Mountains to enter Spillane Fjord south of Devetaki Peak, on the east coast of the Antarctic Peninsula. Sir Hubert Wilkins photographed this feature from the air in 1928 and gave it the name "Crane Channel", after C.K. Crane of Los Angeles, reporting that it appeared to be a channel cutting in an east-west direction across the peninsula. The name was altered to "Crane Inlet" following explorations along the west coast of the peninsula in 1936 by the British Graham Land Expedition, which proved that no through channel from the east coast existed as indicated by Wilkins.

The speed of Crane Glacier increased threefold after the collapse of the Larsen B Ice Shelf in 2002 and this is likely to be due to the removal of a buttressing effect of the ice shelf.

Tributary glaciers
 Dzhebel Glacier
 Chuchuliga Glacier
 Stob Glacier

See also 
 List of glaciers in the Antarctic
 List of Antarctic ice streams
 Glaciology

Further reading 
 Rignot, E.; Casassa, G.; Gogineni, P.; Krabill, W.; Rivera, A.; Thomas, R. (2004), Accelerated ice discharge from the Antarctic Peninsula following the collapse of Larsen B ice shelf, Geophysical Research Letters. 31 (18): L18401. Bibcode:2004GeoRL..3118401R. doi:10.1029/2004GL020697
  Campbell, A. J.; Hulbe, C. L.; Sergienko, O., Investigating the response of Crane Glacier, Antarctic Peninsula to the disintegration of the Larsen B ice shelf using a 2-D flowline model, American Geophysical Union, Fall Meeting 2009, abstract id. C21D-0463
 T. A. Scambos, J. A. Bohlander, C. A. Shuman, and P. Skvarca, Glacier acceleration and thinning after ice shelf collapse in the Larsen B embayment, Antarctica, GEOPHYSICAL RESEARCH LETTERS, VOL. 31, L18402, doi:10.1029/2004GL020670, 2004
 J. Wuite, H. Rott, M. Hetzenecker, D. Floricioiu, J. De Rydt, G. H. Gudmundsson, T. Nagler, and M. Kern, Evolution of surface velocities and ice discharge of Larsen B outlet glaciers from 1995 to 2013, The Cryosphere, 9, 957–969, 2015 www.the-cryosphere.net/9/957/2015/ doi:10.5194/tc-9-957-2015
 United States. Defense Mapping Agency. Hydrographic Center, Sailing Directions for Antarctica: Includes Islands South of Latitude 60°, P 332

References

External links 
 Retreat of Crane Glacier at the NASA Earth Observatory

Glaciers of Oscar II Coast